Snow Globe is the fifteenth studio album by English synth-pop duo Erasure, released by Mute Records on 11 November 2013 in the United Kingdom and on 12 November 2013 in North America.  The album has a holiday music theme, including classic Christmas carols with original tracks written by band members Vince Clarke and Andy Bell and is produced by longtime collaborator Gareth Jones.

Background
The band purposely went with a "stripped-down" and "eerie" feel to many of the tracks, including traditional Christmas ballads "Silent Night" and "White Christmas".  Clarke stated, "Everything about Christmas has been written already.  We thought it would be more interesting to look into the darker side of the season. For a lot of people, Christmas is not a happy time."
  
"Blood on the Snow" starts with a staccato style waltz, whilst "Silver Bells" features an android-like orchestra from the future and explores dark imagery of coal, ash and blood, that give way to a bright star and three gifts.

Singles
Snow Globe was preceded by the first single "Gaudete" on 28 October, a dance floor take on the on 16th century medieval Latin carol that was also a hit for Steeleye Span in 1973. The second single is the jubilant "Make it Wonderful" and the first track on the album, "Bells of Love", has been described as John Lennon-esque.

Deluxe edition
The second CD of the limited edition of Snow Globe includes an acoustic cover version of the 1980s Christmas pop hit "Stop the Cavalry" by Jona Lewie, the traditional spoken piece editorial of Yes, Virginia, there is a Santa Claus, as well as several other acoustic versions and remixes.

Commercial reception
Snow Globe appeared briefly at the lower reaches of the albums charts, peaking at number 49 in the UK and number 100 in Germany. The album reached numbers 5 and 30 on the UK and US indie albums charts, respectively.

Track listing
Snow Globe was initially released as a standard CD, a digital download, and a limited edition 3-CD box set which includes the original album as well as alternative versions.  The box set, produced in a single run of 3,000 copies, contained an autographed Christmas card, red 'Erasure' branded Christmas tree ornament, a desktop calendar, postcards, 'Erasure' branded balloons (one red, one green), windows stickers, a bag of sweets, and a cocktail book. It sold out via pre-orders before the official release date.

In 2014, an extended Deluxe Nutcracker Edition digital download was made available, including the album, all additional tracks from the second disc of the box set, as well as additional remixes - comprising 29 tracks in all, as well as the videos for "Gaudete" and "Make It Wonderful".

In 2016, to follow BMG's commemoration of the band's 30th anniversary in releasing all previous albums on vinyl (both reissues, and first-ever pressings), Snow Globe was also issued for the first time on vinyl in an extended 2-LP set of which the first pressings were on white vinyl. The second disc contained a selection of previously released alternate versions and remixes.

Charts

References

Erasure albums
2013 Christmas albums
Christmas albums by English artists
Mute Records albums
Pop Christmas albums